Rienzi vowing to obtain justice for the death of his young brother, slain in a skirmish between the Colonna and the Orsini factions (or simply, Rienzi) is a painting by William Holman Hunt, produced in 1849 and currently in a private collection.

History
This painting, with its extremely long title, was the first of Hunt's works to include 'PRB' (Pre-Raphaelite Brotherhood) on the canvas.

Hunt took his subject from the 1835 novel Rienzi, the Last of the Roman Tribunes, by Bulwer Lytton, about Cola di Rienzi (1313–1354), a papal notary who led a popular uprising in Rome.  It was exhibited at the 1849 Royal Academy exhibition (alongside Millais' Lorenzo and Isabella) with the following excerpt from the novel, describing the hero's reaction to the incident:
{{quotation|But for that event, the future liberator of Rome might have been but a dreamer, a scholar, a poet, - the peaceful rival of Petrarch - a man of thoughts, not deeds. But from that time, all his faculties, energies, fancies, genius, became concentrated to a single point and patriotism, before a vision, leaped into the life and vigour of a passion.|Rienzi, the Last of the Roman Tribunes, Book I, chap. 1, 23}}

In 1847, Hunt repeatedly sat up all night to finish John Ruskin's Modern Painters (1843); in Rienzi he attempted to put into practice all that he had read. The background particularly was painted in careful detail trying to satisfy Ruskin's stringent requirements. As can be seen from some of Hunt's later work, such as The Hireling Shepherd (1851) and The Awakening Conscience (1854), the artist often experienced great difficulty with painting his figures in natural poses. This is evident here in the portrayal of the soldier on the far left of the painting.

See also
English school of painting
List of Pre-Raphaelite paintings
Cola di Rienzo

References

Bibliography

External links
Rienzi in the Rossetti Archive
Rienzi at VictorianWeb
Birmingham Museums and Art Gallery's Pre-Raphaelite Online Resource  Large online collection of about fifty paintings on canvas and works on paper of William Holman Hunt
William Holman Hunt in the "History of Art" — a paper by Albert Boime published originally in The Art Bulletin'' 84 no1 94-114 Mr 2002.
Phryne's list of pictures by Hunt 
The Pre-Raph Pack

1849 paintings
Paintings by William Holman Hunt
Horses in art
Paintings about death
Moon in art